Giuseppe Orefici (born 1946) is an Italian archaeologist noted for his studies of the Pre-Hispanic civilizations of the Nazca and Rapa Nui cultures.

Biography 
Orefici has a degree in architecture. Since 1982 he has been Director of the Nasca Project and has conducted several investigations in Peru, Bolivia, Chile, Mexico, Cuba, and Nicaragua. He directed archaeological excavations in the ceremonial center of Cahuachi(Peru) since 1984, Pueblo Viejo near Nazca (1983–85), Tiwanaku, Bolivia from 2007 to 2014, and Easter Island (1991–93, 2001).

He has published several books and articles on Nasca and Rapa Nui cultures and has curated numerous exhibitions on Pre-hispanic culture in the Americas and in Europe. The most important research, which continues, is the archaeological excavation and conservation of Cahuachi.

Current research 
Orefici is Director of Centro de Estudio Arquelogicos Precolombinos, :es:Museo Arqueológico Antonini in Nazca, Peru and the Nasca Project. He is concentrating on the study of Nasca and Tiwanaku civilizations, with particular reference to architecture, and pre-Hispanic petroglyphs.

Scientific publications 
Ligabue G., Orefici G., Rapa Nui, Erizzo, 1994.
Orefici G., Nasca: arte e società del popolo dei geoglifi, Jaca Book, Milano, 1993.
Orefici G., Cahuachi. Capital Teocratica Nasca. Lima: University of San Martin de Porres, 2012.
Orefici G., Mensajes de nuestros antepasados: petroglifos de Nasca y Palpa, Apus Graph Ediciones, Lima, 2013
Lasaponara R., Masini N., Orefici G. (Eds). The Ancient Nasca World: New Insights from Science and Archaeology. Springer International Publishing, 2016

Bibliography 
Aimi A., Arqueólogos Intelectuales Italianos en el Peru. Instituto Italiano de Cultura de Lima, Lima, 2015, pp. 46–47.

References 

1946 births
Living people
Italian archaeologists